Anna Castillo Ferré (born 9 October 1993) is a Spanish actress. From 2013 to 2016, she played Dorita in soap opera Amar es para siempre. Her film breakthrough came with the role of Alma in the drama El Olivo (2016) for which she won a Goya Award for Best New Actress.

Biography
Anna Castillo Ferré was born in Barcelona on 9 October 1993. From the age of seven, Castillo enrolled into various acting schools in Barcelona and Madrid, later studying at Saint Joan Bosco Horta college. She graduated with a bachelors of arts in 2011. Between 2005 and 2011, she formed part of music group sp3, in which she was a singer and dancer. After the group retired from public performances they 
become part of the television show la Família dels supers on TV3 from 2011 to 2014.

Castillo's acting debut was in 2009 on the television movie El enigma Giarcomo, on TV3, in which she played the role of Maiana. She made her feature film debut in Elena Trapé's Blog (2010). In 2016, Castillo starred as Alma in El Olivo, a role for which she won the Goya Award for Best New actress, depicting a granddaughter desperate to retrieve her beloved grandfather's olive tree in the hope that it will awaken him from his vegetative state. The movie was also named as one of three films that could be chosen as the Spanish submission for the Best Foreign Language Film at the 89th Academy Awards, but it was not selected.

Filmography

Film

Television

Accolades

References

Living people
1993 births
21st-century Spanish actresses
Actresses from Barcelona
Spanish film actresses
Spanish television actresses